The doshpuluur (Tuvan: дошпулуур) is a long-necked Tuvan lute made from wood, usually pine or larch.  The doshpuluur is played by plucking and strumming. 
There are two different versions of the doshpuluur. One version has a trapezoidal soundbox, which is covered on both sides by goat skin and is fretless. The other has a kidney-shaped soundbox mostly of wood with a small goat or snake skin roundel on the front and has frets.
 
Traditionally the instrument has only two strings, but there exist versions of it with three or even four strings. The two strings are commonly tuned a perfect fifth apart, with the third string usually forming the octave. Sometimes the two strings are tuned a perfect fourth apart.  Like the other stringed instruments of Tuva, it is traditionally used as an accompaniment for a solo performance.

See also
 Igil
 Music of Tuva
 Topshur

References
 This article is originally based on material from TyvaWiki, used under the conditions of the GFDL.

External links
Doshpuluur Demo, photos, and text

Necked lutes
Tuvan musical instruments
Tuvan music